|}

The Legacy Cup is a flat horse race in Great Britain open to horses aged three years or older. It is run at Newbury over a distance of 1 mile and 3 furlongs (2,213 metres), and it is scheduled to take place each year in September.

The event was established in 1997, and the inaugural running was won by Posidonas. It initially held Listed status, and was promoted to Group 3 level in 2004. It was previously known as the Arc Trial but rarely served as a trial for the Prix de l'Arc de Triomphe. The race lost its Group 3 status when it was removed from the Pattern and Listed race programme in 2023.

Records
Most successful horse (2 wins):
 Compton Bolter – 2003, 2005
 Blue Monday – 2006, 2008
 Desert Encounter – 2017, 2019

Leading jockey (3 wins):
 Jim Crowley - Algometer (2016), Young Rascal (2018), Elarqam (2020)

'Leading trainer (4 wins)
 David Simcock - The Corsican (2015), Algometer (2016), Desert Encounter (2017, 2019)Sir Michael Stoute - Fantastic Light	(1999), Doctor Fremantle (2009), Hillstar (2014), Solid Stone (2021)

Winners

See also
 Horse racing in Great Britain
 List of British flat horse races

References

 Racing Post:
 galopp-sieger.de – Arc Trial.
 horseracingintfed.com – International Federation of Horseracing Authorities – Arc Trial (2018).
 pedigreequery.com – Arc Trial Stakes – Newbury.

Flat races in Great Britain
Newbury Racecourse
Open middle distance horse races
Recurring sporting events established in 1997
1997 establishments in England